Oosterzee is a village in De Fryske Marren municipality in the province of Friesland, the Netherlands. It had a population of around 915 including surrounding area in 2017.

History
Oosterzee was a road village which started in the Middle Ages as two settlements: Oosterzee-Buren and Oosterzee-Gietersebrug. From the 18th century onwards, peat excavation and poldering transformed the area into cultivated land.

The Dutch Reformed Church was built in 1860 in neoclassical as a replacement of a medieval church which is located outside the village. In 1840, it was home to 880 people. In 1892, a dairy factory opened in Oosterzee, and closed in 1993. The factory was demolished in 2006 and replaced by a marina and a villa ward, however the chimney remains, because telecommunication companies used the chimney.

Before 2014, Oosterzee was part of the Lemsterland municipality.

Gallery

References

External links

De Fryske Marren
Populated places in Friesland